is a 2002 Japanese film directed by Shiori Kazama. Themes of the film include adultery and homosexuality, as Mars connotes both fighting and sexual intercourse.

Plot
The film explores the relationship problems of two couples, Kohei and Kinuko, and Manabe and Hijiri, and the solutions they try to devise as a way out. Kohei and Kinuko, despite their age differences, seem like a happy pair, but there is an insurmountable distance between them. Kohei is married to another woman, and Kinuko, though she knows he will never divorce, can't bring herself to break off the relationship and start anew. Manabe and Hijiri, meanwhile, start off happily enough, but eventually their passion begins to wane as Manabe starts looking to other women for sex. Hijiri, feeling rejected, moves into an apartment next door to Kinuko, where she plots to break up the mismatched couple to her own advantage.

Cast
Makiko Kuno as Kinuko Takeuchi
Mami Nakamura as Hijiri Tokita
Fumiyo Kohinata as Kohei Deguchi
Kiyohiko Shibukawa as Tatsuya Manabe
Eri Hayasaka as Arimi Deguchi
Haruku Shinozak as Fumiyo Komatsu
Ryuichi Hiroki

Awards
The film won the Asian Film Award at the 2001 Tokyo International Film Festival held October 27-November 4, 2001.

Release
The film was presented at the Berlin International Film Festival on February 12, 2002. It was screened at the 24th PIA Film Festival on July 1, 2002 and was released theatrically in Japan on September 28, 2002.

References

External links
 
 
The Mars Canon Official Site 
 Bravissima! introduction

2002 films
Japanese LGBT-related films
Lesbian-related films
2000s Japanese films